The self-expansion model is a theory of social psychology proposed by Arthur Aron which attempts to explain how people maintain close relationships with others. Aron believed humans have an initial motivation to incorporate others’ characteristics – such as parts of their identity, perspectives, and values – into themselves to help establish a mutual identity, improve self-efficacy, and enhance the sense of self.

The self-expansion model is based on two key different but connected principles. The first is that humans have a primary motivation to improve ("expand") their self-efficacy. The second principle is that individuals often achieve expansion through close relationships which allow the inclusion of the other in the self. This is part of the reason why humans maintain close relationships in their lives.

According to the self-expansion model, people increase potential efficacy by creating close relationships, which in turn increases material and social resources, perspectives, and identities. Some examples of resources include the following: social support, possessions, information, friendship networks and knowledge. People could also achieve self-expansion through a group or a community.

Self-expansion motivation

One of the underlying themes of self-expansion is that individuals have a very basic motive to self-expand. Unlike Maslow's hierarchy of needs theory, it is omnipresent: only low-level needs are met before high-level needs will appear. The need of self expansion occurs even if there is a basic need that is unsatisfied.  Some researchers believe that self-expansion, like hunger and thirst, originates from the basic physiological needs in the nervous system, and is associated to the reward system in the brain. Some researchers also believe that the motivation for self-expansion is partly rooted in social approval and acceptance. Self-expansion may be conscious or unconscious. People may sometimes realize a sense of "self-expansion" or strive to achieve a goal that can promote self-expansion, but most of the time, self-expansion is an unconscious motivation

Self-expansion is the desire to enhance an individual's potential efficacy. Motivational models often refer to self-efficacy as one's belief that they are competent and can achieve specific goals. Within the self-expansion model, potential efficacy is used instead, as it only refers to obtaining resources that will make goal attainment possible. Achievement of this goal is a secondary concern.

However, the motivation to self-expand still does influence attraction to others for a potential close relationship. Aron and Aron suggest that our attraction is broken down into two components based on Rotter's value-expectancy approach.

 Desirability is the perceived total amount of self-expansion possible from a potential close relationship.
 The second factor, probability, refers to the likelihood that the close relationship with the individual can actually be formed. It can also be conceptualized as the likelihood that self-expansion will occur. Consequently, individuals will seek a partner that has high social status and a greater number of resources. However, to maximize self-expansion, consideration is also given to how likely this person will be loyal and desires to be in the close relationship.

Measuring self-expansion motivation 
The self-expansion model was originally established to explore the question, "Why do people develop and maintain relationships?" It attempts to describe people's feelings and actions in intimate relationships, therefore related research is mostly based on intimate relationships and the motivation behind the relationship. In 2002, Lewandowski and Aron designed the Self-expansion Questionnaire (SEQ) to explore expanding self and relationship. The self-expansion questionnaire (SEQ) is composed of several key components from the self-expansion model. It contains a total of 14 items to measure the degree of increase in the knowledge, skills, and abilities that an individual has experienced from his or her partners. There are three representative questions: “How much does your partner help to expand your sense of the kind of person you are?”; “How much has knowing your partner made you a better person?”; and “How much do you see your partner as a way to expand your own capabilities?”.

Including the other in the self

The second principle of the self-expansion model is that people use close relationships to self expand by including the other in the self. The self is often described as the content or the knowledge of who we are. Others could be interpreted as individuals. Some studies have also found that individuals will also include groups or communities.

According to Aron and Aron, when entering a close relationship a person should perceive that the self and other should begin to overlap by including aspects of the other in the self. More specifically, after people include others into themselves, they feel that they have the same resources, ideas, and identity as others, and they will think that the resources, ideas, and identity that others have gained or lost are also what they have gained or lost. These new resources lead to greater inclusion of the other in the self by also incorporating the other's perspectives and identities in the self.

Aron, Aron, Tudor and Nelson conducted several classic studies that scientifically demonstrated that we include the other in the self.

 In one experiment, participants were more likely to distribute money equally between the self and the close other in comparison to distributing the money between oneself and a stranger. The sharing of resources was suggestive of including the self in the other.
 In a second experiment, participants were more likely to remember more nouns for a stranger than a close other (one's mother). This supported the IOS phenomenon, as participants were more likely to take the perspective of the close other thus not being able to remember descriptive nouns of that person.
 In a final experiment participants were required to make yes/no decisions on whether certain traits belonged to themselves. Decisions on traits that were different between a participant and a close other had longer reaction times than decisions on traits that were different between a participant and a stranger.

It was suggested that the increased confusion between the self and the close other was directly related to integrating the other in the self. The degree of closeness in the relationship affects the self and other reaction studies. As two individuals become closer, there is greater confusion and therefore a longer reaction time. As a result, as closeness of a relationship increases, there will be a greater inclusion of the other in the self.

Measuring inclusion of the other in the self

The Inclusion of the Other in the Self Scale (IOS Scale) is one of the most frequently used tools to assess this phenomenon. The scale consists of seven Venn diagram-like pairs of circles that vary on the level of overlap between the self and the other. Respondents are asked to select the pair of circles that best represents their current close relationship. Several studies have showed that this measurement tool is effective in getting accurate depictions of the amount of closeness and the inclusion of the other in the self.

IOS has also been assessed with the Continuous IOS, a Java-based applet suitable for online surveys that measures IOS on a continuous scale from 0-100 Participants are instructed to use their mouse to move one of the circles (typically labeled "self") towards the other (typically labeled "other") until the degree of overlap best describes the relationship in question. The IOS Scale has also been adapted to measure inclusion in other contexts, for example community connectedness via the Inclusion of Community in the Self Scale. The adaptability of IOS is broad as demonstrated by recent versions substituting target with "X."

Inclusion of the ingroup in the self

The idea of including the other in the self has been extended to include an entire ingroup in the self. An ingroup is an interdependent set of individuals with which a person identifies. The individual believes he or she is a member of this group. In fact, several academic groups have found similar findings in the me/not me reaction time paradigm at a group level. Participants showed a slower reaction time for traits that were incongruent between the self and ingroup. This was in comparison to quicker reaction times for traits that were congruent between the self and ingroup. The slow reaction times were consistent with the inclusion of the ingroup in the self claim as it suggested that the individual had included group characteristics in the self. As a result, there was difficulty recalling if a trait belong to the self or ingroup.

Several researchers have examined the role of ingroup identification (i.e. a person's prolonged psychological connection to an ingroup) and self-expansion. In fact, Trop and Wright refined the meaning of ingroup identification and believed it was analogous to the inclusion of the ingroup in the self. The authors found that the degree of connectedness to the ingroup will affect confusion of self-descriptors. People who highly identified with an ingroup showed slower reaction times for self-descriptors that did not relate to the ingroup (this is consistent with previous findings). However, low ingroup identification lead to no differences in reaction times between whether or not the self-descriptors were also descriptive of the ingroup. This demonstrated that the level of identification with an ingroup can be conceptualized as the degree to which we will include the ingroup in the self.

The central motivation for including the ingroup in the self parallels the self-expansion model at the interpersonal level. The self-expansion model suggests that we are strongly motivated to expand ourselves by including the other in the self. This occurs when an individual incorporates the other's perspectives, identities and resources. Likewise, it has been proposed that including an ingroup in the self, or ingroup identification, is partly influenced by the self-expansion motive. Inclusion of the ingroup's perspectives and resources can increase one's confidence in completing a variety of goals. Thus, a group's attractiveness is often based on the potential for self-expansion. A group with higher social status and a greater amount of potential resources is more likely to be included in the self.

Measurement of inclusion of the ingroup in the self

Tropp and Wright created an instrument to measure the extent that an individual includes the ingroup in the self. The Inclusion of the Ingroup in the Self Scale (ISS Scale) was based on the Inclusion of the Other in the Self Scale. Similar to the original scale, seven pairs of circles vary on the degree of overlap between the self and the particular ingroup. The scale has been well validated and the degree of inclusion of the ingroup in the self is said to capture the sense of ingroup identification.

Inter-group relations

An abundance of research focuses on the negative interactions between different groups (e.g. negative attitudes, intolerance, discrimination). However, there is sparse evidence to explain the positive aspects of intergroup relations such as reduction of prejudice. The contact hypothesis (by Gordon Allport) is one area of psychology that focuses on positive aspects of intergroup relations. The hypothesis suggests that when there is cooperation, equal status, common goals and authority support then contact between members of different groups can result in reduced negative attitudes. In addition, positive emotions between intergroup members was said to be of utmost importance as it would lead to positive attitudes which, in turn, would generalize to the entire out group. An out group is set of individuals with which the individuals does not identify. It was unclear how this attitude generalization actually happened. Recently, the process of including the out group in the self was used as an explanatory mechanism for this generalization.

Including the out group in the self is based on the similar self-expansion notion of including the other or ingroup in the self. As a person becomes a friend with an out group member, the aspects of the out group is included in the self when that group is made salient. Essentially, representation of the out group and its identity is shared with our representation of the self. Including the out group in the self can vary; a person may actually become a member of an out group. However, in certain circumstances this is virtually impossible and we simply psychologically identify with the group even though we are aware that we are not part of it. Upon inclusion of the out group in the self, we now give that group several benefits. These benefits include taking pride in the group, sharing resources, and positive biases in causal explanations of the group. These benefits all increase the likelihood for reduced out group prejudice, hence its use as a mechanism for the contact hypothesis.

It is important to note that the focus of the inclusion of the out group in the self is initially at the interpersonal level (i.e. between individuals). The interaction needs to have interpersonal closeness for inclusion of the self in the other to occur. Consequently, a decategorized approach to contact should be used where the focus is on personal identities instead of group identities. By focusing on personalization, there is a greater chance for the development of closeness. Eventually, group membership needs to become available so that an individual can now include the out group in the self as well. However, it is believed that group membership will become more central in a natural manner as the close relationship develops.

Empirical evidence seems to support the inclusion of the out group in the self hypothesis. In one study white women were paired off with either another white woman (ingroup member) or a Latina woman (out group member). The pairs of women met over an extended period of time completing different activities together, which led to a measurable close friendship. Women with an intergroup friendship were more likely to have positive intergroup attitudes, less likely to endorse anti-minority policies and less likely to demonstrate intergroup anxiety. The study suggests that the intergroup close relationship led to improved attitudes towards the entire out group as suggested by the inclusion of the out group in the self mechanism. Another study also found that the level of inclusion of the out group in the self would affect the amount of decreased prejudicial attitudes. Further, simply including a friend in the self who has a close relationship with an out group member can decrease out group prejudiced attitudes. Knowing that a friend includes an out group member in the self allows for the individual to include that entire out group in the self. In turn, this also leads to positive attitudes about the out group.

Self-expansion motive

It may be the case that individuals want to make friends with out group members (instead of oppress and mistreat the out group) because of the self-expansion motive. Based on Aron and Aron's original work, people want to expand the self and an optimal way of doing so is to make close friendships that give the opportunity for increased perspectives, identities and resources. People who are most similar to ourselves provide a diminished capacity for self-expansion. As a result, an individual may turn to out group members for friendship because they are different from one's self-concept. These differences allow for a greater likelihood to increase resources, identities and perspectives, which is consistent with the self-expansion motive. A recent study has shown that, consistent with this idea, priming high self-expansion motivation enhances out group self-expansion and the quality and outcomes of out group interactions (e.g. greater self-efficacy, reported closeness, and self-growth).

Barriers to self-expansion at the intergroup level

Self-expansion motives can explain why people may appreciate intergroup contact, however, it can also provide explanations for why we avoid this intergroup contact. People may be cautious of self-expansion due to a sense of self-loss. As we self-expand in one area we may put ourselves at risk of losing aspects of the self in another area. Consequently, people may be fearful of creating a close relationship with an out group member as this may trigger animosity from original ingroup members. Often individuals must attempt to balance the potential benefits of including the out group in the self with the potential loss of ingroup friends and the associated resources. If the self-loss outweighs the self-expansion, it is possible for a decrease in perceived self-efficacy.

The second barrier to self-expansion is the risk that an overabundance of self-expansion might occur in too short a period. The accumulation of new resources and perspectives in our self-concept leads to a need for self-integration (i.e. combining different resources, identities and perspectives into single overarching self-concept). An excessive amount of self-expansion without proper self-integration can be quite stressful (e.g. moving to a new city, or starting a new job). It has been suggested that when a person is socially stable, self-expansion via an out group member is most likely to be successful. Consequently, the likelihood for cross-group contact and the inclusion of the out group in the self is dependent on the degree of self-expansion in other domains. Expansion = motivation and believing.

Self-expansion beyond relationships
More recently, self-expansion research has begun to shift away from investigating self-expansion in a social context (e.g. romantic relationships) and instead has focused on self-expansion processes and outcomes of self-expansion at the individual level. Research has also focused on self-expansion in domains such as the workplace. Results of these research studies has shown that self-expansion can (and does) occur at the individual level (e.g. through hobbies and spiritual experiences) and in workplace settings. Similar to findings from social self-expansion literature, individual self-expansion also has positive effects and includes the same processes (e.g. motivation, self-efficacy). Self-expansion has also been presented theoretically within a framework of self-concept change. That is, self-concept change can be thought of as occurring along two independent dimensions: valence (positive vs. negative content) and direction of change (increase vs. decrease in content) and self-expansion represents one of the four possible processes of self-concept change (increasing positive content).

Self-expansion and relationship

Couple preference 
According to the theory of interpersonal attraction, the similarity is one of the most important factors affecting interpersonal relationships. People prefer partners with similar interests, backgrounds, and values. Studies have shown that perceived similarity and likeness can promote interpersonal attraction. Especially for the values: the higher the similarity in values, the more satisfying the marriage relationship. However, the reality is the opposite: Most real-life partners do not show similarities in personality traits. Regarding this phenomenon, self-expansion believes that individuals choose partners who are not similar to themselves because they can bring more opportunities for self-expansion, and provide more novel resources, opinions, and identification. When individuals are in a situation of uncertainty, they tend to choose partners similar to themselves. When they are stable, they are more inclined to select partners who are not similar to them. The basic assumption in interpersonal attraction is that others can bring rewards. The more direct rewards people provide, the stronger the attraction to us. The more dissimilar the partner's value life experience, social status are from ours, the more opportunities for self-expansion will be provided. It seems that individuals who can bring more opportunities for self-expansion are more rewarding to us.

Relationship maintenance 
The self-expansion model suggests that when couples participate in some self-expansion activities, these activities can increase relationship satisfaction and improve relationship quality. A study by Reissman, Aron, and Bergen (1993) confirmed that partners assigned to participate in exciting self-expansion activities reported a higher quality of relationships than those assigned to only pleasurable activities. Graham (2008) combined self-expansion and flow theory and got the same result. He used the Experience Sampling Method to ask participants (20 cohabiting couples:13 married couples and 7 unmarried couples; 19 heterosexual and 1 homosexual). When receiving the signal from the Personal Digital Assistant, they immediately record their current activities, emotional experience, and relationship satisfaction. Research data confirms that in real-life situations, couples participating in self-expansion activities can increase the satisfaction and fulfillment of the relationship.

However, if a relationship cannot provide the individual with sufficient self-expansion, that person may seek self-expansion needs through an affair, which will lead to infidelity.

References

Behavioral concepts
Psychological concepts